Honeyford is a surname. Notable people with the surname include:

David Honeyford, Northern Irish politician
Jim Honeyford (born 1939), American politician
Paul Honeyford (born 1958), English biographer
Ray Honeyford (1934–2012), British headmaster

See also
Gloria Hunniford (born 1940) Northern Irish television presenter